Planica 1977 was a Smuški poleti Ski Flying Week competition, held from 18 to 20 March 1977 in Planica, Yugoslavia. With total 50,000 people in three days.

Schedule

Competition
On 17 March 1977 official training was on schedule. 23 jumpers from 6 countries who applied for the competition made two training jumps. Bachler was the longest with 165 metres.

On 18 March 1977 first day of competition was on schedule. Austrian Reinhold Bachler was leading after first day with tied hill record, now holding together with Walter Steiner at 169 metres. Best one of three rounds counted into final results.

On 19 March 1977 second day of competition was on schedule. Austrian Reinhold Bachler set the new hill record at 172 metres in the trial round. Best one of two rounds in competition counted into final results.

On 20 March 1977 last third day of competition was on schedule in front of 20,000 people. Yugoslavian Bogdan Norčič touched the ground at trial round at 181 metres world record distance, which was the first ever fly over one hundred-eighty metres in history. Best one of two rounds in competition counted into final results.

Official training
17 March 1977 — Two rounds — chronological order

 Fall or touch!

Competition: Day 1
18 March 1977 — 1 best of 3 rounds

Competition: Day 2
19 March 1977 — 1 best of 3 rounds

Competition: Day 3
20 March 1977 — 1 best of 3 rounds

Official results
Three rounds counted into official results — one best round from each three days.

Invalid ski flying world record
This was the first ever jump over 180 metres in history.

 Not recognized! Touch at world record distance.

References

1977 in Yugoslav sport
1977 in ski jumping
1977 in Slovenia
Ski jumping competitions in Yugoslavia
International sports competitions hosted by Yugoslavia
Ski jumping competitions in Slovenia
International sports competitions hosted by Slovenia
March 1977 sports events in Europe